Arnoldo Cruz "Miguel" Perez (born September 7, 1957) is an American actor. He has appeared in many television series, films, and stage productions.

Career
Perez has appeared in such television shows as: The Wonder Years, Beverly Hills, 90210, Chicago Hope, Frasier (Carlos 'The Barracuda' Del Gato) 24 (Ranger Mike Kramer), and CSI: Crime Scene Investigation. However his  was Luis in an episode of Seinfeld ("The Cheever Letters"). In the episode, he played a Cuban man who dealt Cuban Cigars to Cosmo Kramer in return for his jacket. He became friends with Luis and his gang and they even became golf partners in Westchester County.

Filmography

References

External links
 

1957 births
Living people
American male film actors
American male stage actors
American male television actors
20th-century American male actors
21st-century American male actors
Male actors from San Jose, California